Nupol Kiazolu (born June 12, 2000) is an American activist and founder of Vote 2000. Topics on which Kiazolu advocates include civil rights, domestic and sexual violence, and homelessness. Kiazolu is currently studying at Hampton University in Virginia.

Early life 
sm.Nupol Kiazolu grew up in Brooklyn with her single mother. They lived in a homeless shelter. Kiazolu began her activist activities at the age of twelve, following the killing of Trayvon Martin in 2012, an event which also sparked the birth of the Black Lives Matter Movement. Shocked at the treatment Martin had received, Kiazolu decided to hold a silent protest in response. Kiazolu showed up to her middle school the next day wearing a hoodie with the message "Do I look suspicious?" taped to the back, as well as picking up some skittles and an iced tea from 7-11 to represent what Trayvon Martin was carrying when he was killed. She faced opposition from the staff at the school, and was sent to the principal's office and threatened with a suspension if she would not remove the hoodie. With the support of her math teacher, she confronted the principal, who ultimately decided to allow Kiazolu to state her case to him after a day of research about it. Kiazolu spent the night researching her rights as a student, and was able to successfully argue her case by citing the Supreme court case "Tinker vs. Des Moines," with her principal the next day, earning her the right to wear her hoodie at school as an act of activism. Kiazolu would later go on to say that this argument with a school official that allowed her to take part in a formal form of activism was the defining moment for her to go into organization and activism.

Career 
In 2017, Kiazolu founded Vote 2000, a campaign focused on increasing the effort to get more young people of color registered to vote. She partnered with the website Dosomething.org and set a clear goal of registering 100,000 young people to vote, and is attempting to set even higher numbers today.

In August 2017, Kiazolu participated in the counterprotest against the "Unite the Right" rally being held in Charlottesville. Her motives for going were simple, that a counterprotest would need as many people as possible. There she saw face to face members of Neo-Nazi groups and the KKK, and was subjected to tear gas attacks on behalf of the police and KKK, and was even assaulted by a KKK member. She was not injured further, and was able to flee the scene after the death of Heather Hayer.

In 2019, Kiazolu competed in and won the Miss Liberia beauty pageant under the platform being focused on uniting the African and African American communities by working with organizations in Liberia, and raising awareness and funds for infrastructure, education and healthcare in the West African nation.

In May 2020 after the murder of George Floyd, Kiazolu went to Minnesota to help coordinate the Black Lives Matter resistance efforts.

On July 14, 2020 Kiazolu was arrested in Louisville, Kentucky while protesting at the home of state Attorney General Daniel Cameron following the death of Breonna Taylor. She was released the next day.

Education 
Kiazolu is a full-time student at Hampton University studying political Science and pre-law. Hampton University is a Historically Black College/University (HBCU) located in Hampton, Virginia.

Presidential Aspirations 
Kiazolu aspires to run for US presidency in the year 2036, where she hopes to reframe how the country thinks about key issues, including racism and homelessness. Her main goal is to make America a place where success is not determined by zip code.

Kiazolu views political polarization as the biggest threat to free speech in America.

References 

American activists
Black Lives Matter people
People from Brooklyn
2000 births
Living people
20th-century African-American people